Rimal or Remal is an upscale neighborhood in Gaza City located  from the city center. Situated along the coastline, it has been considered the most prosperous neighborhood of Gaza. The main street that runs through Gaza, Omar Mukhtar Street runs northwest–southeast in the district and the main coastal road, Ahmad Orabi/Rasheed Street northeast-southwest. Rimal is currently divided into the city districts of Southern Rimal and Northern Rimal.

History
Rimal was built on the ancient port city of Gaza called Maioumas. The intense rivalry between Christian Gaza and Pagan Maioumas continued throughout the Byzantine era, even after the population of Maioumas had been converted to Christianity by Imperial decree and the Pagan sanctuaries destroyed by Porphyry of Gaza. The coastline of Gaza consisted mostly of sand dunes around the bustling Port of Gaza up until the mid-20th century. In the 1930s and 1940s, foreign missionary institutions financed the establishment of a residential neighborhood along the coast. This new district became known as Rimal ("Sand" or "Beach") and today covers most of Gaza City's coastline and much of the area between the coastline and the Old City. Most of the buildings were detached houses built in European style. After the neighborhood's construction, the center of commercial activity shifted from the Old City to Rimal.

Stores in this posh neighborhood stock upmarket goods including facial scrubs, skin-whitening sunscreen, frozen seafood, and low-fat yogurt. Residents shop at the Gaza Mall and dine at the upscale Roots Club restaurant.

Fatah–Hamas conflict

During the Fatah–Hamas conflict of 2006–2007, unidentified gunmen  killed three sons, ages 3 to 9, of Baha Balousha, an intelligence officer with Fatah in the upscale Rimal neighborhood of Gaza City in a drive-by shooting. One of Balousha's bodyguards was also killed.

Landmarks

Rimal contains the Palestinian Presidential Palace, the Governor's Palace, the Gaza Mall, the Roots Club, the United Nations beach club, the Palestinian Centre for Human Rights, the main al-Shifa Hospital, the Palestinian Legislative Council, and a number of foreign government offices, four hotels, and all of the city's well-known restaurants. The Midan Jundi (Soldier's Square), dedicated to an indigenous Arab soldier who died fighting in the 1948 Arab-Israeli War, is located in Rimal along with the Palestine Liberation Organization flag shop. The port of Gaza is in the Rimal district and home to the Palestinian Naval Police force.

People from Rimal
Mahmoud al-Zahar

References

Bibliography

  

 

Populated places established in the 1930s
Neighborhoods of Gaza City